Iwaszkiewicz is a Polish surname. Notable people include:

 Jarosław Iwaszkiewicz (1894-1980), Polish writer and communist politician
 Piotr Iwaszkiewicz (born 1959), Polish historian and diplomat
 Robert Iwaszkiewicz (born 1962), Polish politician
 Wacław Iwaszkiewicz-Rudoszański (1871-1922), Polish general

Polish-language surnames